Baldwin, Count of Hainaut may refer to:

Baldwin I, Count of Hainaut ( 1051–70), also Baldwin VI of Flanders
Baldwin II, Count of Hainaut (r. 1070–98)
Baldwin III, Count of Hainaut (r. 1098–1120)
Baldwin IV, Count of Hainaut (r. 1120–1171)
Baldwin V, Count of Hainaut (r. 1171–95), also Baldwin VIII of Flanders
Baldwin VI, Count of Hainaut (r. 1195–1205), also Baldwin IX of Flanders and Baldwin I of the Latin Empire

See also
Baldwin (name)